Ernest Bell (8 March 1851 – 14 September 1933) was an English author, publisher and activist for animal rights and welfare, humanitarianism and vegetarianism.

Biography

Bell was born in Hampstead, the son of the publisher George Bell. He was educated at St Paul's School, London and attended Trinity College, Cambridge, graduating in 1873 with an BA and an MA in 1876. During his time at Cambridge, Bell had joined the RSPCA in 1873 and in 1874 had become a vegetarian after reading Dr. Thomas Low Nichols' pamphlet How to Live on Sixpence a Day. Bell learned German in Dresden after graduation.

Bell's first wife was Elize Wilhelmina Wolfel, who died in 1881; they had one daughter together. In 1893, he married Marie Anna von Taysen; they had no children.

Bell spent most of his adult life working for his father's publishing company George Bell & Sons; he was one of the first known English publishers to be a follower of Ralph Waldo Emerson. He spent much time on the "administration and fund-raising for three main reform causes: vegetarianism, humanitarianism, and animal welfare."

Bell wrote the Preface for E. W. Bowdich's vegetarian cookbook New Vegetarian Dishes, in 1893. He was also the editor of the Animals Life Readers, a series of books and launched the journal Animals' Friend (which he also edited). He became a member of the Vegetarian Society and was elected a vice-president in 1896 and was president from 1914.

Bell was a friend of Henry S. Salt and was Chairman of the Humanitarian League. He was also a close friend of fellow animal campaigner Jessey Wade, who worked for him as his secretary until his death.

For thirty years, Bell was the Honorary Secretary of the Hampstead Society for the Prevention of Cruelty to Animals. He was also the Chairman of the Committee of the Anti-Vivisection Society and of the National Anti-Vivisection Society and involved with the Anti-Bearing Rein Association, National Canine Defence League (now Dogs Trust) and the Royal Society for the Protection of Birds. Bell founded the League Against Cruel Sports (LACS) in 1924 with Henry B. Amos, Jessey Wade and George Greenwood.

Bell became chairman of the board of directors of George Bell & Sons in 1926 and in 1929, he received a lifetime award from a collaboration between 22 different animal societies.

Bell died in Hendon in 1933, at the age of 82.

Contributions to organisations 
Bell donated a significant amount of his income to various societies throughout his life. He also co-founded and worked for a number of animal and vegetarian organisations:
 Animals' Friend Society (Council member)
 Anti-Bearing Rein Association (Hon. Secretary)
 Anti-Vivisection Society (Chairman)
 Cats Protection League (now known as Cats Protection; Treasurer)
 Humanitarian League (Chairman and Treasurer for over 20 years)
 League for the Prohibition of Cruel Sports (now known as the League Against Cruel Sports; co-founder and Hon. Treasurer)
 London Vegetarian Society (Chairman of Committee)
 National Anti-Vivisection Society (Chairman)
 National Canine Defence League (Council member)
 National Equine Defence League (Treasurer)
 National Society for the Abolition of Cruel Sports (co-founder)
 Performing and Captive Animals' Defence League (co-founder)
 Pit Ponies' Protection Society (Treasurer)
 Royal Society for the Protection of Birds (Council member)
 Society for the Prevention of Cruelty to Animals (Hon. Secretary of the Hampstead branch for 30 years)
 Vegetarian Society (Vice-President 1896–1914; President 1914–1933)

Legacy 
A library to preserve Bell's writings known as the Ernest Bell Library, was proposed by Henry S. Salt in 1934 and was established by the executive of the Vegetarian Society in 1936. The library has more than 1,500 books, journals, magazines and newspapers. It is currently cared for by The Humanitarian League, a Hong Kong-based organisation named after the original Humanitarian League.

Selected publications

The Animals' Friend (1904)
Christmas Cruelties (1907)
The Inner Life of Animals (editor, 1913)
Stray Thoughts About Vegetarians (1910)
Why Do Animals Exist? (1910)
Big-Game Hunting (1915)
The Need for Humane Education (1915)
In a Nutshell: Cons and Pros of the Meatless Diet (1920)
An After-Life for Animals (1922)
Speak Up for the Animals: Poems for Reading and Recitations (editor, 1923)
Some Social Results of the Meatless Diet (1924)
Bell's Joy Book (1926), Bell donated all of the profits to the Vegetarian Home for Children
Fair Treatment for Animals (1927)
The Humane Diet and Common Sense (1927)
Proper Relationship between Men and the Other Animals (1927)
Superiority in the Lower Animals (1927)
Summer School Papers: Animal, Vegetable and General (1928)
The Wider Sympathy (1932)

References

Further reading
 Charles W. Forward. (1898). Fifty Years of Food Reform: A History of the Vegetarian Movement in England. London: The Ideal Publishing Union.

External links 

 Biography of Ernest Bell
 Ernest Bell Bibliography
 The Ernest Bell Library, Our Etymological Past, Sixpences, Dogs and Anti-Vivisection
 "A Year's Progress in Animal Protection" by Ernest Bell, 1 January 1911

1851 births
1933 deaths
Alumni of Trinity College, Cambridge
Anti-hunting activists
Anti-vivisectionists
British animal welfare scholars
British animal welfare workers
British vegetarianism activists
English animal rights activists
English editors
English humanitarians
English nature writers
English pamphleteers
English publishers (people)
Founders of charities
People associated with the Vegetarian Society
People educated at St Paul's School, London
People from Hampstead